Sagadapata railway station is a railway station on the East Coast Railway network in the state of Odisha, India. It serves Sagadapata village. Its code is SGDP. It has two platforms. Passenger, MEMU, Express trains halt at Sagadapata railway station.

Major trains
 Puri–Barbil Express

See also
 Kendujhar district

References

Railway stations in Kendujhar district
Khurda Road railway division